TRAF2 and NCK-interacting protein kinase is an enzyme that in humans is encoded by the TNIK gene.

Function 

Germinal center kinases (GCKs), such as TNIK, are characterized by an N-terminal kinase domain and a C-terminal GCK domain that serves a regulatory function.

Interactions
TNIK has been shown to interact with KIAA0090, although the significance is unclear. TNIK has been shown to phosphorylate Gelsolin, a protein involved in F-actin depolymerisation thus inducing cytoskeletal changes.

TNIK plays an important role in pulmonary fibrosis. Inhibitors of TNIK are used in the treatment of pulmonary fibrosis.

References

Further reading